Wooster is an unincorporated community in Meriwether County, in the U.S. state of Georgia.

History
The community was named after George Wooster, proprietor of a local country store. A post office called Wooster was established in 1894, and remained in operation until 1910.

References

Unincorporated communities in Georgia (U.S. state)
Unincorporated communities in Meriwether County, Georgia